Pagetopsis macropterus species of marine ray-finned fish belonging to the family Channichthyidae, the crocodile icefishes. This species is found in the Southern Ocean.

Taxonomy
Pagetopsis macropterus was first formally described in 1907 as Champsocephalus macropterus by the Belgian-born British ichthyologist George Albert Boulenger with the type locality given as near Cape Armitage, Ross Island in Victoria Land. When Charles Tate Regan described the genus Pagetopsis this was its type species by monotypy. The specific name macropterus means "large finned" an allusion to the large dorsal and pelvic fins, especially those of juveniles.

Description
Pagetopsis macropterus has around 15 narrow dark bars, lighter at the center, on its grayish green body and dark stripes on its cheeks but has a whitish ventral area. The dorsal fins contain 12-15 spines and 27-32 soft rays while the anal fin has 24-27 soft rays. It has a large mouth with the maxilla reaching a level with the front third of the eye and this has two rows of conical teeth in each jaw. The caudal fin is almost truncate but can be rounded.

Distribution, habitat and biology
Pagetopsis macropterus has a circum-Antarctic distribution on the continental shelf and the South Shetland Islands.
The defense posture, noted in a study in 1969, is  opening the mouth wide, expanding the corner of the mouth and the opercula, erecting the dorsal fin, holding the flared pectoral fins at a right angle towards the body, and bending the body into a semicircle. The same study suggested that this behavior was developed to deter predators such as the Weddell seal (which preys heavily on this species). Adults feed on fishes and krill. It is of no interest to commercial fisheries.

References

Macropterus
Fish of the Southern Ocean
Fish of Antarctica
Fish described in 1907
Taxa named by George Albert Boulenger